Blake Acres is a professional Australian rules footballer who plays for the Carlton Football Club in the Australian Football League (AFL), having previously played for  and .

AFL career
He made his debut in Round 7, 2014, against Hawthorn, in a game in which St Kilda were defeated by 145 points.

He earned the AFL Rising Star nomination following a breakout performance against  in Round 6, 2016.

Acres made his debut for Fremantle during round four of the 2020 AFL season in their clash against . Acres played seven games during 2020 due to a hamstring injury disrupting his start to the season. Acres returned during the latter half of the season with strong form averaging almost 25 disposals a game. Acres played 18 games in 2021 and played in Fremantle's 2022 finals campaign.

Statistics
 Statistics are correct to the end of the 2022 season

|- 
! scope="row" style="text-align:center" | 2014
|
| 40 || 3 || 1 || 0 || 11 || 15 || 26 || 3 || 8 || 0.3 || 0.0 || 3.7 || 5.0 || 8.7 || 1.0 || 2.7 || 0
|-
! scope="row" style="text-align:center" | 2015
|
| 8 || 7 || 0 || 1 || 44 || 39 || 83 || 18 || 18 || 0.0 || 0.1 || 6.3 || 5.6 || 11.9 || 2.6 || 2.6 || 0
|-  
! scope="row" style="text-align:center" | 2016
|
| 8 || 16 || 7 || 6 || 160 || 124 || 284 || 57 || 50 || 0.4 || 0.4 || 10.0 || 7.8 || 17.8 || 3.6 || 3.1 || 1
|-
! scope="row" style="text-align:center" | 2017
|
| 8 || 18 || 11 || 4 || 178 || 88 || 366 || 81 || 51 || 0.6 || 0.2 || 9.9 || 10.4 || 20.3 || 4.5 || 2.8 || 0
|-  
! scope="row" style="text-align:center" | 2018
|
| 8 || 12 || 4 || 7 || 129 || 129 || 258 || 47 || 43 || 0.3 || 0.6 || 10.8 || 10.8 || 21.5 || 3.9 || 3.6 || 1
|-
! scope="row" style="text-align:center" | 2019
|
| 8 || 19 || 6 || 5 || 154 || 154 || 308 || 70 || 73 || 0.3 || 0.3 || 8.1 || 8.1 || 16.2 || 3.7 || 3.8 || 0
|- 
! scope="row" style="text-align:center" | 2020
|
| 9 || 7 || 0 || 0 || 75 || 59 || 134 || 40 || 19 || 0.0 || 0.0 || 10.7 || 8.4 || 19.1 || 5.7 || 2.7 || 2
|-
! scope="row" style="text-align:center" | 2021
|
| 9 || 18 || 2 || 0 || 184 || 138 || 322 || 67 || 45 || 0.1 || 0.0 || 10.2 || 7.7 || 17.9 || 3.7 || 2.5 || 0
|- 
! scope="row" style="text-align:center" | 2022
|
| 9 || 20 || 6 || 6 || 287 || 147 || 434 || 115 || 54 || 0.3 || 0.3 || 14.4 || 7.4 || 21.7 || 5.8 || 3.7 || 3
|- class="sortbottom"
! colspan=3| Career
! 120
! 37
! 29
! 1222
! 993
! 2215
! 498
! 361
! 0.3
! 0.2
! 10.2
! 8.3
! 18.5
! 4.2
! 3.0
! 7
|}

Notes

References

External links

1995 births
Living people
West Perth Football Club players
Australian rules footballers from Western Australia
St Kilda Football Club players
Fremantle Football Club players
Sandringham Football Club players
Peel Thunder Football Club players